The Bad Beginning is the first novel of the children's novel series A Series of Unfortunate Events by Lemony Snicket. The novel tells the story of three children, Violet, Klaus, and Sunny Baudelaire, who become orphans following a fire and are sent to live with Count Olaf, who attempts to steal their inheritance.

The book was published on September 30, 1999, by Scholastic Inc. and illustrated by Brett Helquist. An audiobook was released in 2003 with narration by Tim Curry, several special editions of the book have been made and the book has been translated into many different languages. There is a movie based on the series starring Jim Carrey and a Netflix TV mini-series starring Neil Patrick Harris.

Synopsis
Violet Baudelaire is fourteen years old and loves creating amazing inventions; Klaus Baudelaire is twelve and an obsessive reader; Sunny Baudelaire is a baby and has four surprisingly large and sharp buck teeth, with which she loves to bite. While they are at Briny Beach, the children are told by a family friend, Mr. Poe, that their parents have died in a fire that destroyed their home. They are placed in the care of Count Olaf, said to be a distant relative although the children have never heard of him before. Olaf's ramshackle house is filthy and covered in disconcerting eye images; it has a tower which the Baudelaires are forbidden from entering. Count Olaf is unpleasant, easily angered, and forces the children to perform odious chores. It becomes clear that Count Olaf is scheming to collect the Baudelaire's fortune. The only solace the children find is spending time with their neighbor, Justice Strauss. 

For the next few days, Olaf keeps the Baudelaires busy by forcing them to clean his house. The Baudelaires disagree but do not dare to object. One day, the Baudelaires are set the task of making dinner for Olaf and his theatre troupe. They make puttanesca, but when Olaf arrives, he demands roast beef. The children remind him that he never asked them to make roast beef, and Olaf becomes angry, lifting Sunny into the air, and striking Klaus across the face after Klaus tells everyone Count Olaf has given them only one bed and a pile of rocks for the three of them to sleep on and to play with.

After a few days, Olaf forces the Baudelaires to participate in a play written by "Al Funcoot" called "The Marvelous Marriage.", forcing Violet to play the role of his bride. After smuggling a book from Strauss's library, Klaus realises that the marriage in the play will be legally binding, meaning Olaf will gain control of their fortune. He confronts Olaf, who has one of his associates put Sunny in a birdcage, dangling from outside the window of his tower. He threatens to kill her if Klaus and Violet do not follow his plan. Violet constructs a makeshift grappling hook and uses it to climb the tower. She finds the hook-handed man (a member of Olaf's theatre troupe) waiting to capture her. Klaus is brought up to the tower and they are locked together in the room until the play begins.

After Violet signs the marriage document, Olaf interrupts to tell the audience that their wedding was legally binding. Justice Strauss and Mr. Poe both object, but concede that the law requires them to hand over the Baudelaire fortune to Olaf. Violet interrupts to proclaim that the marriage was not legally binding, as she signed with her left hand despite being right-handed and the wording is 'own hand'. Justice Strauss agrees that this invalidates the marriage. Before Olaf can be arrested for locking up Sunny, one of his associates turns the lights in the theatre off and he is able to escape. Justice Strauss tells the Baudelaires that she is willing to adopt them; however, Mr. Poe says that this would go against their parents' will, as Justice Strauss is not their relative. He takes them back to his household until he can find another guardian for them.

Foreshadowing
In the last picture of The Bad Beginning, a snake is curled around a lamppost, foreshadowing the snakes in  The Reptile Room.

Critical reception
In 2012, School Library Journal named The Bad Beginning the 48th best children's novel. Kirkus Reviews noted the uncomfortably macabre tone of the novel, warning that because "the Baudelaire children are truly sympathetic characters", the novel is "not for the squeamish". Catherine Pelosi of Kids' Book Review responded positively to The Bad Beginning, describing it as "exciting, humorous and appropriately dark".

Special editions

The Bad Beginning: Rare Edition
The Bad Beginning: Rare Edition was published by HarperCollins on September 23, 2003. In addition to a box, new cover, and additional illustrations, this edition contains a fourteenth chapter filled with author's notes, many of which foreshadow later events in the series or provide excessively detailed information about the events in The Bad Beginning itself.

The Bad Beginning; or, Orphans!
The Bad Beginning; or, Orphans! is a paperback edition of The Bad Beginning designed to mimic a Victorian penny dreadful. It was released on May 8, 2007. The book features a new full-color cover, seven new illustrations, and the first part of a serial supplement entitled The Cornucopian Cavalcade, which in this edition includes the first of 13-part comic entitled The Spoily Brats along with a page of Victorian-era false advertisements, both produced by Michael Kupperman; an advice column written by Lemony Snicket along with a page listing every entry in A Series of Unfortunate Events (some of which are fictional); the first part of a story entitled Q: A Psychic pstory of the psupernatural by Stephen Leacock.

Other special editions
Two more editions of The Bad Beginning were published by Egmont Publishing on October 1, 2003—The Bad Beginning: Special Edition and The Bad Beginning: Limited Edition. They come in a larger format and contain three plates of color artwork that are redrawn from the original edition of the book and two plates of new color artwork. The Limited Edition is bound in leather and contained within a box, similar to the Rare Edition, and each copy was signed by Daniel Handler. There is also a new "Short-Lived Edition", released for general sale on June 14, 2012.

Audiobook
Two audiobook versions of this novel were released. The first version was released in September 2003. It was read by Tim Curry and featured Daniel Handler, under the pseudonym Lemony Snicket, who read a portion, A Conversation Between the Author and Leonard S. Marcus, which won an "Earphones Award" on AudioFile, which described the audiobook as "fabulously funny" and complimented the conversation involving Handler.

The second version was released in October 2004, after the release of the film, Lemony Snicket's A Series of Unfortunate Events. This multi-voice cast audio book was narrated by Tim Curry and featured Jim Carrey, Meryl Streep, and Jude Law. This version also included sound effects and a soundtrack. This edition of The Bad Beginning was an Audie Awards finalist for Children's Titles for Ages 8+ in 2005, and a Grammy Award Nominee for Best Spoken Word Album for Children in 2005. AudioFile gave the audiobook a positive review, although stated that "the cast of seven at first sound self-consciously formal until one realizes that the acting is supposed to be as mannered as the clever writing".

Adaptations

Television
The book was adapted into the first two episodes of the first season of the television series adaptation produced by Netflix.

Film
Elements of The Bad Beginning were featured in the 2004 film adaptation of the first three books in the series, Lemony Snicket's A Series of Unfortunate Events.

Translations

Bosnian/Croatian/Serbian Loš početak (Algoritam,);
Brazilian Portuguese Mau Começo, translated by Carlos Sussekind (Companhia das Letras,);
Czech Zlý začátek, translated by Eva Brdičková (Egmont ČR,);
Dutch Het Bittere Begin, translated by Huberte Vriesendorp (Ploegsma,);
Finnish Ankea alku, translated by Mika Ojakangas (WSOY, 2001:	);
French Tout commence mal…, translated by Rose-Marie Vassallo (Éditions Nathan,);
Greek: "Η Κακή Αρχή", translated by Χαρά Γιαννακοπούλου (Ελληνικά Γράμματα, 2002:960-406-186-0);
Indonesian Mula Malapetaka,;
Italian Un infausto inizio, translated by Valentina Daniele (Salani,);
Japanese 最悪のはじまり (Soshisha,);
Korean 눈동자의 집;
Norwegian En grufull begynnelse, translated by Alexander Melli (Cappelen Damm,);
Polish Przykry początek (The Unpleasant Beginning), translated by Jolanta Kozak (Wydawnictwo Egmont Polska,);
Quebec French Nés sous une mauvaise étoile, translated by Rose-Marie Vassallo (Éditions Heritage,);
Romanian Început îndoliat (Egmont,); Înneguratul început (Arthur, 2017);
Russian Скверное начало (Azbuka-Klassika,);
Spanish Un mal principio, translated by Néstor Busquets (Montena,);
Swedish En olustig början (Richters,);
Thai ลางร้ายเริ่มปรากฏ (Nanmeebooks Teen,)
Turkish Kötü Günler Başlarken (Doğan Egmont,).

References

External links
A Series of Unfortunate Events Read Alouds, Activities, and More from HarperCollins publishers, plus: "watch Lemony Snicket read the awfully terrible first book… until he can’t stand it anymore." https://www.harpercollins.com/blogs/harperkids/a-series-of-unfortunate-events-read-alouds-activities-and-more

1999 American novels
Books in A Series of Unfortunate Events
HarperCollins books
American novels adapted into films
American novels adapted into television shows
1999 children's books
Scholastic Corporation books